The Wynnum Manly Ward is a Brisbane City Council ward covering Wynnum, Wynnum West, Manly, Lota, Lytton, Port of Brisbane, and part of Manly West.

Councillors for Wynnum Manly Ward

Results

References 

City of Brisbane wards